The Gateway is a 37-storey, skyscraper complex completed in April 1990 on Beach Road in the Downtown Core of Singapore. The two buildings are named The Gateway East and The Gateway West.

The embassy of Mexico is located on the 3rd floor of The Gateway East. The Singapore office of Mott MacDonald, a global engineering, management and development consultancy, is located on the 35th floor of The Gateway East.

Architecture
The architecture of The Gateway has been described as "world class" by the National Library Board. The buildings were designed by the U.S.-based architect, I. M. Pei. The local Singaporean architectural firm that worked on this project was Chua Ka Seng and Partners Chartered Architects (CKSP).  T.Y. Lin Structural Engineers from San Francisco also collaborated on the project.

The shape of the buildings is trapezoidal, which is similar to the form used by I. M. Pei in the critically acclaimed National Gallery of Art East Building in Washington, D.C.

Tenants
The building's anchor tenants include companies like DHL, Mott MacDonald, Canon, Y Soft as well as the International Table Tennis Federation and Remy Cointreau International.

References

External links

Pei Cobb Freed and Partners Architects LLP

1990 establishments in Singapore
Buildings and structures completed in 1990
Downtown Core (Singapore)
I. M. Pei buildings
Skyscraper office buildings in Singapore
20th-century architecture in Singapore